Do It All was a British do it yourself and home improvement retailing company that underwent a number of changes of ownership. In 1998, the business was sold to Focus DIY, which itself entered administration in 2011, with all its stores closing later that year.

History
The business can trace its roots to two do it yourself chains, Big K and Calypso. These were bought by LCP (Lunt Comley & Pitt) and traded as LCP Homecentres. In 1978, the business was acquired by WHSmith and renamed W.H. Smith Do It All Limited, trading as WHSmith Do It All. 

Do It All sold a range of over 25,000 DIY products, including paint, wallpaper, tools and power tools, as well as construction materials such as plywood and chipboard. All stores had an inhouse timber cutting service, and all but the smallest had in-store concessions for businesses such as Harris Carpets.

During the 1980s, fierce competition saw the chain struggle. In 1988, it merged with the rival chain Payless DIY, which was owned by the Boots Group. As a result, WH Smith and Boots each owned 50% of the combined group, and the Payless stores were rebranded under the Do It All brand. However, following continued losses, WHSmith sold their share in the company to Boots in 1996 for the token amount of £1.

Fate
Boots, wanting to concentrate on its core pharmacy businesses, sold the 139 Do It All stores to Focus DIY in 1998 for £68 million. The stores were initially rebranded under the name Focus Do It All, and later, in 2001, to simply Focus, following the company’s purchase of Great Mills the previous year.

Focus DIY had also acquired Wickes in 2000, and some former Do It All stores were converted to Wickes, mostly in areas felt to be outside the core market. Soon after, the Do It All name disappeared completely.

References

External links 
 

British companies established in 1963
British companies disestablished in 2001
Home improvement companies of the United Kingdom
Retail companies established in 1963
Retail companies disestablished in 2001
Defunct retail companies of the United Kingdom
1996 mergers and acquisitions
1998 mergers and acquisitions